WEC 51: Aldo vs. Gamburyan was a mixed martial arts event held by World Extreme Cagefighting that took place on September 30, 2010 at the 1stBank Center in Broomfield, Colorado. This was the only event that the WEC hosted in Colorado.

Background
Alex Karalexis was expected to face debuting Chinese prospect Tiequan Zhang at this event, but was removed because of an injury and replaced by UFC veteran Jason Reinhardt. However, Reinhardt would also be forced from the card after failing a pre-fight eye exam, and was replaced by WEC newcomer Pablo Garza. The Zhang-Reinhardt matchup would later be rescheduled as a featherweight bout for UFC 127 following the UFC-WEC merger, with Zhang winning by submission.

Clint Godfrey was originally slated to face Demetrious Johnson at this event, but was pulled from the bout due to injury and replaced by WEC newcomer Nick Pace.

This event drew an average of 486,000 viewers on Versus.

Results

Bonus Awards
Fighters were awarded $10,000 bonuses.
Fight of the Night:  Donald Cerrone vs.  Jamie Varner
Knockout of the Night:  George Roop
Submission of the Night:  Miguel Torres

See also
 World Extreme Cagefighting
 List of World Extreme Cagefighting champions
 List of WEC events
 2010 in WEC

External links
Official WEC website

References

World Extreme Cagefighting events
2010 in mixed martial arts
Mixed martial arts in Colorado
Sports in Broomfield, Colorado
2010 in sports in Colorado